Erik Johansson Vasa (c. 1470 – 8 November 1520) was a Swedish noble and the Lord of Rydboholm Castle in Roslagen. His son would rule  as King Gustav I of Sweden from 1523–1560.

Biography
He was born around the year 1470 to Johan Kristiernsson Vasa and Birgitta Gustafsdotter Sture in a village named Örby in the province of Uppland, Sweden. He was one of four children from Johan and Birgitta. His father  Johan was a first cousin of Knut Tordsson (Bonde), father of  King Charles VIII of Sweden. His mother  Birgitta was a sister of Sten Sture the Elder.

Erik Johansson Vasa was a faithful adherent of the Stures, a powerful and influential family in Sweden from the late 15th century to the early 16th century, and was notorious for his irritable and arbitrary temper. He assisted the Stures in fighting against the Danes, who controlled most of Sweden during the early 16th century. When the Danes, led by King Christian II of Denmark, conquered Sweden and seized the capital city Stockholm in 1520, several members of the Sture party were executed in the Stockholm Bloodbath in November of that year. Among those executed was Erik Johansson Vasa on 8 November 1520.

His first son, Gustav Eriksson Vasa, had escaped from Denmark some time before this event, and survived. He became King Gustav I of Sweden  from 1523 until his death in 1560 and founder of the House of Vasa. His reign marked the final secession of Sweden from the Danish dominated Kalmar Union which had dated from 1397.

Personal life
He married Cecilia Månsdotter Eka (c. 1476–1523) and had eight children with her. All of their children were born in either Orkesta or Rydboholm Castle  in the present-day county of Stockholm. 
Their children were:

Gustav Eriksson Vasa (12 May 1496 – 29 September 1560) would become King Gustav I of Sweden in 1523.
Margareta Eriksdotter Vasa (1497 – 31 December 1536)
Johan Eriksson (b. 1499, d. young)
Magnus Eriksson (1501–1529)
Anna Eriksdotter (1503–1545), nun at Vadstena Abbey
Birgitta Eriksdotter (b. 1505, d. young)
Marta Eriksdotter (1507–1523)
Emerentia Eriksdotter (1507–1523)

See also
Foundation of modern Sweden
Kalmar Union
Line of succession to the Swedish Throne

References and Notes

Other sources
Ahnlund, Nils. Gustav Adolf the Great. Princeton, NJ: Princeton University Press, 1940.

1470 births
1520 deaths
Year of birth uncertain

Erik Johannson
Swedish rebels
Vasa Johansson, Erik
Vasa Johansson, Erik
People executed by the Kalmar Union
15th-century Swedish people
16th-century Swedish people
People executed in the Stockholm Bloodbath
16th-century executions by Denmark